Shai Maimon (born on March 18, 1986) is an Israeli football Defender, currently playing in the Liga Leumit for the Ironi Nesher.

Days after he made a move to Maccabi Herzliya in 2007 he acquired a first team place in the club, and also made a great achievement in winning a place in the U-21 championships with Israel, with a win over France.

Maimon is of a Tunisian-Jewish descent.

Honours
Toto Cup (1):
2006-07
Israeli Premier League (1):
2010-11

References

1986 births
Living people
Israeli Jews
Israeli footballers
Association football defenders
Maccabi Haifa F.C. players
Maccabi Herzliya F.C. players
Beitar Nes Tubruk F.C. players
F.C. Ashdod players
Maccabi Ahi Nazareth F.C. players
Ironi Tiberias F.C. players
Ironi Nesher F.C. players
Israeli Premier League players
Liga Leumit players
Footballers from Netanya
Israel under-21 international footballers
Israeli people of Tunisian-Jewish descent